Tenerife is a town and municipality of the Magdalena Department in northern Colombia.

References

External links
 Tenerife official website
 Gobernacion del Magdalena - Tenerife

Municipalities of Magdalena Department